Chawpi Urqu (Quechua, chawpi central, middle, urqu mountain, "central mountain", also spelled Chaupi Orko) is a  mountain in the Apolobamba mountain range in Bolivia. It is located in the La Paz Department, Franz Tamayo Province, Pelechuco Municipality, near the Peruvian border. Chawpi Urqu lies east of the mountains Surapata and Kulli Pata and north of Q'umir Pata.

References 

Mountains of La Paz Department (Bolivia)